The 1989–90 FIBA European Champions Cup was the 33rd season of the European top-tier level professional FIBA European Champions Cup (now called EuroLeague). It was won by Jugoplastika, after they beat FC Barcelona Banca Catalana 72-67. It was the club's second title overall. The culminating 1990 EuroLeague Final Four was held at Pabellón Príncipe Felipe, Zaragoza, Spain, on 17–19 April 1990. Toni Kukoč was named Final Four MVP.

Competition system

27 teams (European national domestic league champions only), playing in a tournament system, played knock-out rounds on a home and away basis. The aggregate score of both games decided the winner.
The eight remaining teams after the knock-out rounds entered a 1/4 Final Group Stage, which was played as a round-robin. The final standing was based on individual wins and defeats. In the case of a tie between two or more teams after the group stage, the following criteria were used to decide the final classification: 1) number of wins in one-to-one games between the teams; 2) basket average between the teams; 3) general basket average within the group.
The top four teams after the 1/4 Final Group Stage qualified for the Final Stage (Final Four), which was played at a predetermined venue.

First round

|}

Round of 16

|}

Quarterfinal round

Final four

Semifinals 
April 17, Pabellón Príncipe Felipe, Zaragoza

|}

3rd place game
April 19, Pabellón Príncipe Felipe, Zaragoza

|}

Final
April 19, Pabellón Príncipe Felipe, Zaragoza

|}

Final standings

Awards

FIBA European Champions Cup Final Four MVP
 Toni Kukoč ( Jugoplastika)

FIBA European Champions Cup Finals Top Scorer
 Toni Kukoč ( Jugoplastika)

References

External links
1989–90 FIBA European Champions Cup
1989–90 FIBA European Champions Cup
Champions Cup 1989–90 Line-ups and Stats

FIBA
EuroLeague seasons